Zolotonosha is a city located in Cherkasy Oblast (region) in central Ukraine. It hosts the administration of Zolotonosha urban hromada, one of the hromadas of Ukraine. Population: 

Zolotonosha is located on the Zolotonoshka River, a tributary of the Dnipro River within  of the oblast's administrative center, Cherkasy.  The city is also located on the railroad line from Bakhmach to Odessa, and on the freeway from Kyiv to Kremenchuk and from Cherkasy to Shramkivka.

Administrative status 
Until 18 July, 2020, Zolotonosha was designated as a city of oblast significance and belonged to Zolotonosha Municipality but not to the Zolotonosha Raion even though it was the center of the raion. As part of the administrative reform of Ukraine, which reduced the number of raions of Cherkasy Oblast to four, the city was merged into the Zolotonosha Raion.

History 
Zolotonosha was first mentioned in written works around 1576. In 1635 Zolotonosha was granted the Magdeburg rights. From 1640 to 1648, the town was directly ruled by Jeremi Wiśniowiecki, a Polish magnate. After 1796 it was incorporated into Malorossia and then in 1802 became a part of Poltava Governate, meaning that Jews were allowed to settle in the city and started to gradually arrive in larger numbers.

There was a pogrom in October 1905, which ended with much of the town being burned down and Jews being targeted.

Following the Ukrainian War of Independence (1917–1921), Zolotonosha became part of the Ukrainian SSR, a republic of the Soviet Union. During this period, there were two more pogroms, one on April 24, 1919 committed by local bandits, and another on May 12 committed by Red Army troops.

In 1939, the 2,087 members of the Jewish community comprised 11.4% of the town's total population. On September, 1941, 300 Jews were murdered in a mass execution. On 22 November, 1941, in Strunkovka, just northwest of the town, more than 3,500 Jews were killed in another massacre. The city was liberated by the Red Army in September 1943. When the Soviet Union dissolved in 1991, the city became part of Ukraine.

Climate

Monuments of architecture 
 Preobrazhenska Church of the Krasnohirsky Monastery. Designed by Ivan Hryhorovych-Barskyi in the Ukrainian Baroque style; built in 1767–1771. 
 Sviato-Uspenskyi Cathedral, 1909.
 Statue of Taras Shevchenko, 1924–1926.

People 
 Ivan Poddubny (26 September, 1871 (Krasenivka village)–8 August, 1949, Yeysk) Russian and Soviet singles wrestler and multiple-time world wrestling champion
 Isaac Boleslavsky (9 June, 1919–14 February, 1977, Minsk) Jewish chess grandmaster
 Ber Borochov (4 July, 1881–17 December, 1917, Kyiv) Jewish founder of the Poale Zion party and supporter of the Red Army
 Abe Elenkrieg (1878–1965) American klezmer musician
 Meyer Kanewsky (c. 1880–1924) American Hazzan and opera singer

See also 

 List of cities in Ukraine

Gallery

References

External links
 The murder of the Jews of Zolotonosha during World War II, at Yad Vashem website.
  (1972) Історіа міст і сіл Української CCP - Черкаська область (History of Towns and Villages of the Ukrainian SSR - Cherkasy Oblast), Kyiv.
 

Cities in Cherkasy Oblast
Zolotonoshsky Uyezd
Cities of regional significance in Ukraine
Holocaust locations in Ukraine
Populated places established in 1576